Shyama Dey Shaw (born 8 July 1971) is an Indian former cricketer who played as an all-rounder, batting left-handed and bowling left-arm medium. She appeared in three Test matches and five One Day Internationals for India between 1995 and 1997. She played domestic cricket for Bengal.

References

External links
 
 

Living people
1971 births
People from Howrah
Indian women cricketers
India women Test cricketers
India women One Day International cricketers
Bengal women cricketers